"Fast Lanes and Country Roads" is a song written by Roger Murrah and Steve Dean, and recorded by American country music artist Barbara Mandrell. It was released in November 1985 as the second single from the album Get to the Heart.  The song reached number 4 on the Billboard hot Country Singles & Tracks chart.

Chart performance

References

1986 singles
1985 songs
Barbara Mandrell songs
Songs written by Roger Murrah
Song recordings produced by Tom Collins (record producer)
MCA Records singles
Songs written by Steve Dean